The Magicians is an American fantasy television series that airs on Syfy and is based on the novel of the same name by Lev Grossman. Michael London, Janice Williams, John McNamara, and Sera Gamble serve as executive producers. A 13-episode order was placed for the first season in May 2015, and the series premiered on December 16, 2015, as a special preview.

Series overview

Episodes

Season 1 (2015–16)

Season 2 (2017)

Season 3 (2018)

Season 4 (2019)

Season 5 (2020)

Ratings

Season 1

Season 2

Season 3

Season 4

Season 5

Notes

References

Lists of American fantasy television series episodes